Amr Barakat (born 1 October 1991) is an Egyptian footballer currently playing for Egyptian club El Gouna.

Youth
Entering the Al Ahly S.C. youth academy at age 5 as a left-winger, he left them at aged 15 to Zamalek SC.

Career

Lierse
Playing for Lierse S.K., Amr scored a hat-trick in an 8–2 victory over Royal Stade Waremmien F.C. in the Belgian Cup in June 2016.

Return to Al Ahly
He signed a contract for the duration of three years to transfer back to Al Ahly S.C. He was included in the Al Ahly S.C. 22-man squad versus Ismaily SC, he has not scored a goal yet for Al Ahly S.C.

Career Statistics

References

External links
 

Lierse S.K. players
Association football wingers
Egyptian footballers
Association football midfielders
Living people
1991 births
Al Ahly SC players
Smouha SC players
Al-Shabab FC (Riyadh) players
Egyptian Premier League players
Saudi Professional League players
Egyptian expatriate sportspeople in Belgium
Expatriate footballers in Belgium
Egyptian expatriate sportspeople in Saudi Arabia
Expatriate footballers in Saudi Arabia